Elapsoidea is a genus of venomous elapid snakes commonly known as African garter snakes. Despite the common name, they are unrelated to the harmless North American garter snake species.

Species
The following ten species are recognized as being valid.
Elapsoidea boulengeri Boettger, 1895 – Boulenger's garter snake – Botswana, Malawi, Tanzania, Zambia, Zimbabwe
Elapsoidea broadleyi Jakobsen, 1997 – Broadley's garter snake – Somalia
Elapsoidea chelazzii Lanza, 1979 – Somali garter snake – Somalia
Elapsoidea guentherii Bocage, 1866 – Günther's garter snake – Angola, Cameroon, Democratic Republic of Congo, Republic of Congo, Zambia, Zimbabwe
Elapsoidea laticincta (F. Werner, 1919) – Werner's garter snake – Cameroon, Chad, Central African Republic, Democratic Republic of Congo, Ethiopia, Sudan, Uganda
Elapsoidea loveridgei Parker, 1949 – Loveridge's garter snake – Burundi, Democratic Republic of Congo, Ethiopia, Kenya, Rwanda, Sudan, Tanzania, Uganda
Elapsoidea nigra Günther, 1888 – black garter snake – Tanzania
Elapsoidea semiannulata Bocage, 1882 – Angolan garter snake – throughout central Africa
Elapsoidea sundevallii (A. Smith, 1848) – Sundevall's garter snake – Botswana, Eswatini, Mozambique, Namibia, South Africa, Zimbabwe
Elapsoidea trapei Mané, 1999 – Senegal garter snake – Senegal

Nota bene: A binomial authority in parentheses indicates that the species was originally described in a genus other than Elapsoidea.

References

Further reading
Bocage JVB (1866). "Reptiles nouveaux ou peu connus recueillis dans les possessions portugaises de l'Afrique occidentale, qui se trouvent au Muséum de Lisbonne ". Jornal de Sciencias Mathematicas Physicas e Naturales, Academia Real das Sciencias de Lisboa 1: 57–78. (Elapsoidea, new genus, p. 70). (in French).
Branch, Bill (2004). Field Guide to Snakes and other Reptiles of Southern Africa. Third Revised edition, Second impression. Sanibel Island, Florida: Ralph Curtis Books. 399 pp. . (Genus Elapsoidea, p. 104).

 
Snake genera
 
 
Taxa named by José Vicente Barbosa du Bocage